The Riviersonderend Mountains are a mountain range in the Cape Fold Belt of the Western Cape province of South Africa. They run east to west from Riviersonderend to Villiersdorp, separating the Breede River Valley from the Overberg region. They are composed of Table Mountain Sandstone and attain a maximum height near McGregor and Riviersonderend as Pilaarkop. The ranges are rich in fynbos flora and experience a typical Mediterranean climate.

The name stems from the Sonderend River, and was originally a literal translation of the Khoi-khoi name "Kannakamkanna" ("river without end") into Afrikaans.

References

Mountain ranges of the Western Cape